Robert John Wilson (14 July 1865 – 5 November 1946) was Labour MP for Jarrow.

Born in Gateshead, Wilson was privately educated before becoming the manager of a drapers' shop.  He joined the Labour Party and was elected to Sunderland Borough Council in 1907.  He stood in Newcastle-upon-Tyne North at the 1918 general election, but was defeated.  However, he won the seat of Jarrow at the 1922 general election, standing down from the council after his win.  From 1924, he served as Parliamentary Private Secretary to William Leach.  He lost his seat to the Conservatives at the 1931 general election.

References

External links
 

People from Jarrow
Politicians from Tyne and Wear
Labour Party (UK) MPs for English constituencies
National Union of Distributive and Allied Workers-sponsored MPs
1865 births
1946 deaths
UK MPs 1922–1923
UK MPs 1923–1924
UK MPs 1924–1929
UK MPs 1929–1931